Events from the year 1851 in Denmark.

Incumbents
 Monarch – Frederick VII
 Prime minister – Adam Wilhelm Moltke

Events

 February  The Danish troops return to Copenhagen from the First Schleswig War.
 1 May  Natalie Zahle launches a programme for the training of female private teachersm an initiative which will eventually develop into N. Zahle's School.
 16 October  The first section of the Lübeck–Lüneburg railway is opened.

Undated
 Hagen & Sievertsen is founded in Odense.

Culture

Art
 31 March  The Charlottenborg Spring Exhibition opens.
 Wilhelm Marstrand's painting of Church-Goers Arriving by Boat at the Parish Church of Leksand on Siljan Lake is part of the exhibition.

Births
 3 January – Viggo Johansen, painter (died 1935)
 26 February  Peter Kristian Prytz, physicist (died 1929)
 23 July – Peder Severin Krøyer, painter (died 1909)

Deaths
 9 March – Hans Christian Ørsted, physicist and chemist, discoverer of electromagnetism (born 1777)
 11 July  – Ole Jørgen Rawert, government official and topographic painter (born 1786)
20 December – Gebhard Moltke, nobleman, landowner and civil servant (born 1764).

References

 
1850s in Denmark
Denmark
Years of the 19th century in Denmark